Agustín Hausch (born 21 May 2003) is an Argentine professional footballer who plays as a forward for San Lorenzo.

Professional career
On 5 July 2019, Hausch signed his first professional contract with San Lorenzo. Hausch made his professional debut with San Lorenzo in a 1-0 Argentine Primera División loss to Racing Club on 22 February 2020.

International career
Hausch is a youth international for Argentina, first representing the Argentina U16s in 2019.

References

External links
 
 San Lorenzo Profile
 

2003 births
Living people
People from Baradero
Argentine footballers
Argentine people of German descent
Association football forwards
San Lorenzo de Almagro footballers
Argentine Primera División players
Sportspeople from Buenos Aires Province